The consort kin was the kin or a group of people related to an empress dowager or a consort of a monarch or a warlord in the Sinosphere. The leading figure of the clan was either a (usually male) sibling, cousin, or parent of the empress dowager or consort.

Consort kins can be seen as a manifestation of nepotism in Sinospheric imperial politics. While some were competent, only relying on their female relatives for their initial audiences with the emperor and then proving their worth at their positions (e.g. Wei Qing and Huo Qubing), many turned out to be corrupt and incompetent (e.g. Yang Guozhong). Corrupt and incompetent consort kins have been linked to the downward turn of fortunes for many dynasties.

Pronunciation 
外戚 is pronounced wàiqī or ngoih chīk (Mandarin and Cantonese Chinese), ngoại thích (Vietnamese), waecheog (외척, Korean), gaiseki (がいせき, Japanese).

Notable consort kins

Ancient China

Han Dynasty 

Lü Clan - relatives of the Empress Lü Zhi, consort of Emperor Gaozu of Han
Wei Qing - a younger paternal half-brother of the Empress Wei Zifu, consort of Emperor Wu of Han, one of the major military leaders of wars against the Xiongnu
Huo Qubing - a nephew of Wei Qing and Wei Zifu, also an important general in the war between Han China and Xiongnu.
Huo Guang - a younger paternal half-brother of Huo Qubing, whose granddaughter became the empress of Emperor Zhao of Han, and daughter became an empress of Emperor Xuan of Han. He played an extremely important political role in the eras of Emperor Zhao and Emperor Xuan, sometimes overshadowing the power of the emperors.
Shangguan Jie - Paternal grandfather of Emperor Zhao's wife (Huo Guang was the maternal grandfather). He was involved in a power struggle with Huo Guang, and killed in 80 B.C. after being accused of plotting a rebellion.
Wang Mang - nephew of Empress Dowager Wang, cousin of Emperor Cheng of Han and founder of the Xin Dynasty.
Ma Yuan - father of Empress Ma, consort of Emperor Ming of Han, a major general of Emperor Guangwu of Han who led the expedition to Jiaozhi (today's northern Vietnam). However, Ma Yuan had passed away before Emperor Ming ascended the throne.
Dou Xian - brother of Empress Dowager Dou and brother-in-law of Emperor Zhang of Han.
Liang Ji - brother of Empress Dowager Liang and Empress Liang, deposed two emperors and later killed in a coup d'etat plotted by eunuchs against him.
Dou Wu -  father of Empress Dowager Dou Miao and killed in his abortive coup d'etat against eunuchs.
He Jin - brother of Empress Dowager He and killed after his plot against eunuchs was exposed
Dong Cheng - father of Consort Dong of Emperor Xian of Han and known for his abortive coup d'etat with Liu Bei against Cao Cao.
Cao Cao — father of Empress Cao Jie, consort of Emperor Xian.

Three Kingdoms 

 Mi Fang, a brother of Lady Mi (Mi Furen) of Liu Bei, Emperor Zhaolie of Shu Han. His betrayal of Shu Han partially led to its loss of Jing Province and the death of general Guan Yu.

Jin Dynasty (266–420) 
Yang Jun - father-in-law of Emperor Wu of Jin China
Yu Liang - brother of Empress Dowager Yu
Chu Pou - father of Chu Suanzi

Northern and Southern Dynasties 
Northern Zhou: Yang Jian, father of the last empress dowager. He later usurped the throne and founded the Sui Dynasty.

Tang Dynasty 
 Zhangsun Wuji — elder brother of Tang Taizong's empress. He was one official entrusted by Taizong to assist the young Tang Gaozong in governing the state.
 Wu Chengsi and Wu Sansi—nephews of Empress Wu
 Yang Guozhong — cousin of Yang Guifei

Song Dynasty 
Jia Sidao - younger brother of Consort Jia, a favorite of Emperor Lizong

Yuan Dynasty 
Khongirad — the clan of Genghis Khan's wife Börte and Kublai Khan's wife Chabi

Qing Dynasty 
Songgotu — the paternal uncle of Empress Xiaochengren, Kangxi Emperor's consort.

Ancient Japan

Asuka period 

Ōmiwa clan
Mononobe clan

Katsuragi clan
Ōtomo clan
Soga clan — consort kin in the reigns of Emperor Suiko and Emperor Sushun
Soga no Umako and  — assassinated Emperor Sushun

Heian period 

Fujiwara clan — consort kin in the reigns of emperors Kanmu, Saga, Montoku, Seiwa, Murakami, Reizei, En'yū, Ichijō, Sanjō, Go-Ichijō, Go-Suzaku, and Go-Reizei
Fujiwara no Yoshifusa — father-in-law of Emperor Montoku
Fujiwara no Kaneie — son-in-law of Emperor Murakami, father-in-law of three emperors, maternal grandfather of two emperors
Fujiwara no Michinaga — father-in-law of four emperors
Fujiwara no Yorimichi — married one granddaughter and one great-granddaughter of Emperor Murakami, father-in-law of Emperor Go-Suzaku and Emperor Go-Reizei
Taira clan — consort kin in the reigns of emperors Takakura and Antoku
Taira no Kiyomori — father of Kenreimon'in

Ancient Korea 

Andong Kim clan
Pungyang Jo clan
Yeoheung Min clan

Ancient Vietnam 
Dương Tam Kha — Ngô Quyền's brother-in-law
Lý Công Uẩn — Lê Hoàn's son-in-law
Trần family — Lý Chiêu Hoàng's spousal family
Hồ Quý Ly — maternal grandfather of Trần Thiếu Đế
Mạc Đăng Dung — had his adopted daughter marry Lê Chiêu Tông
Trịnh lords — consort kin of several Lê emperors

Chinese nobility
Kinship and descent
Nepotism